Antoine Andrews (born 12 April 2003) is a Bahamian athlete.  He won the gold medal at the 2022 IAAF World Junior Championships in the 110m hurdles.

Career
Andrews attends St. John's College in Nassau, Bahamas. A versatile athlete he competes in 100m, 200m, 400m, 400m hurdles as well as his speciality, the 110m hurdles.

Andrews won gold at the 2021 U20 NACAC Championships in the 110m hurdles. He claimed the bronze medal at the 2022 CARIFTA Games 110m hurdles, in Kingston, Jamaica and also competed in the 400 metres race and qualified for the  final in which he finished sixth. Andrews broke the national junior record as he won the Bahamas national championship u20 110m hurdles race in June, 2022 in Nassau.

Andrews broke the national 110m hurdles record again in the heats of the 2022 World Athletics U20 Championships, running a time of 13.36 seconds. He then won the final the following day in an even lower time as he won gold in 13.23 seconds.
This equalled the world leading time for an under-20 athlete in 2022. In doing so, he claimed the first Bahamian gold medal in any global championships in a hurdles event.

References

External links

2003 births
Living people
Bahamian male sprinters
Bahamian male hurdlers
World Athletics U20 Championships winners